The Umbrella for Democratic Change (UDC) is an alliance of centre to left-wing political parties in Botswana.

History 
The UDC was founded in November 2012 by members from various opposition parties, including the BPP and BMD. They rallied together in the run-up to the 2014 elections by the Botswana National Front (BNF), the Botswana Movement for Democracy and the Botswana People's Party with the aim of uniting the opposition in the 2014 elections. In February 2017 the Botswana Congress Party, which contested the 2014 elections independently, joined the coalition. The coalition is currently led by Duma Boko from the BNF and plans to contest the 2019 general election jointly, standing a single opposition candidate in each constituency against the ruling Botswana Democratic Party.

The organization of the opposition parties presented an unprecedented challenge to the longtime-ruling BDP, but the BDP was victorious in elections held on October 24, 2014. Their vote share, which garnered 37 seats, allowed them to maintain a majority in the National Assembly, although it won fewer seats than it had in previous elections.

The UDC won 17 seats and the Botswana Congress Party won 3 seats. Ian Khama was easily reelected by the legislative body to another term as president.

In October 2018, the BMD was expelled from the coalition after it refused to forgo contesting constituencies that had originally been allocated to it.

After the 2019 Botswana general election, Duma Boko charged there were “massive electoral discrepancies” and said he wanted to challenge the election in court. Official results show the BDP winning 38 of 57 constituencies.

Electoral history

National Assembly elections

References

Political party alliances in Botswana
Political parties established in 2012
2012 establishments in Botswana